Basketball Without Borders is a basketball instructional camp organized by the NBA in conjunction with FIBA. It presents itself as a “basketball development and community outreach program that unites young basketball players to promote the sport and encourage positive social change in the areas of education, health, and wellness.”

Organized annually since 2001, 41 BWB camps have been held across 23 cities in 20 countries with over 2,300 participants from more than 120 countries and territories, 33 of whom were later drafted into the NBA. Around 150 different current and former NBA/WNBA players have joined nearly 140 NBA team personnel as staff.

History

Billed as a “summer camp for 12-14-year-olds designed to promote friendship and understanding through sport,” the initial editions focused on peace and international relations, bringing together youths from former Yugoslavia in 2001 shortly after the Yugoslav Wars and from Greece and Turkey in 2002 amidst tense Greek–Turkish relations, with leading participation from the UN in both cases.

From the 2003 editions onwards, basketball became the focus of the camps. The age of the participants grew (17 on average) and participants are now mostly selected for their potential, although the selection process by FIBA and national federations is an inclusive system that sees consensual selections from weaker basketball countries.

2003 also saw the first edition of the camp in Africa, seen as uncharted basketball territory at the time. The camps would later expand to the Americas in 2004 and Asia in 2005, including youth from all around the globe (those from Oceania have attended editions in the latter two mentioned regions).

A global camp was first organized in 2015 in New York City as part of the All-Star Game Weekend, giving an opportunity for selected players, identified as the best in their regions, to have a taste of the game at its highest level. This was announced as an recurring annual event.

The camps have gradually become a hotspot for scouts, with an impressive number of former campers who have made it into the NBA (see Attendees) and college basketball. They are seen as a means of spotting unheralded talent with high upside. Players such as Luc Mbah a Moute and Bruno Caboclo are noted examples.

Though basketball skill is now at the forefront of the camp, the social goal is also still pre-eminent. Few campers are expected to make it as pros and a declared goal of the camp is to develop its attendees life-skills, with an emphasis on leadership and personal relations, to make them leaders of change in their home countries.
Ideally, the personal goal for them is to enter a high school or college in the U.S. to get an education they can use in the future. In a given year it was estimated more than 60 former participants were playing and studying in American colleges.

There is a camp for girls as well with coaches from FIBA and the WNBA; however, it receives far less exposure than the boys tournaments.

Basketball Without Borders and program director Masai Ujiri are profiled in Hubert Davis's 2016 documentary film Giants of Africa.

Format

Basketball Without Borders brings together young players (called campers) usually aged 18 and under to a single location for a few days (3 or 4 on average). They are identified by the FIBA, NBA and participating federations with input from international FIBA/ NBA players from the region. For example, some players have been chosen for BWB Africa through Sprite Slam camps in the past.

The youths are divided into teams (sometimes after a draft) named after real NBA teams and managed by coaches who are current and former NBA or FIBA players and coaches.
They attend daily basketball fundamentals clinics (passing, shooting, dribbling...) with these coaches and participate in individual and/or team shooting games for prizes before playing in tournament-style games against the other teams.

Also offered are seminars for the campers to improve their life skills (character, leadership, and health concerns...), normally run by local non-government organizations (NGOs).

The camp ends with an All-Star game featuring the camp's best players. Starting in the 2007 edition, a game MVP and a camp-wide MVP are then elected.

In parallel the organizers also implement social responsibility programs with daily community outreach activities in the local area such as organizing seminars for local youths or Special Olympics.
These are supplemented by product donations to local organizations, such as schools, and usually an NBA Cares initiative such as building or refurbishing playing and educational infrastructures.

The NBA and its corporate sponsors pay for transport, lodging and meals for the campers and the entourage of personnel (including a full training staff for injuries). Some of many examples include the La Ghirada center in Treviso that was used in early camps and was leased for free by Benetton Group, the campers in BWB Africa flown in by South African Airways,  whilst Nike has outfitted the campers in multiple camps.

Camps

Notable Attendees

References

External links
"Basketball Without Borders at.", FIBA. Retrieved on 4 May 2015.
"Basketball Without Borders at.", NBA. Retrieved on 4 May 2015.
(2008). International Cases in the Business of Sport., Case 26: Sports development meets sports marketing in Africa: Basketball without Borders and the NBA in Africa. Butterworth Heinemann. .  Accessible at eLibrary.

Recurring sporting events established in 2001
Youth basketball
Basketball organizations